Scaled and Icy is the sixth studio album by American musical duo Twenty One Pilots. The album was released on May 21, 2021, through Fueled by Ramen and Elektra. The album's title is a play on "scaled back and isolated", a phrase frontman Tyler Joseph associated with music produced during the COVID-19 pandemic, though the phrase is also an anagram of "Clancy is dead", a reference to the protagonist of their previous album, Trench.

Background and production
On March 4, 2019, five months after the release of their fifth studio album Trench, the band confirmed that they were working on their next studio album. About the possible theme, frontman Joseph said, "There's a character that hasn't been talked about on any record yet that plays a huge role in the narrative that obviously will need to be talked about and it's probably where we're going next". On April 9, 2020, the duo released the song "Level of Concern", which marked the first musical output by the duo since the release of Trench. The song encourages the listener to keep hope during hard times, specifically alluding to the COVID-19 pandemic. In a May 2020 interview with Zane Lowe, Joseph expressed uncertainty as to whether their next album would continue Trenchs narrative or would be an "in-between record", explaining: "It's kind of hard for me to tap into the story of Trench and what we've been building on up until that point without being out there, without touring, without having those live shows, without interacting with our fans."

Scaled and Icy was written and largely produced by Joseph in his home studio over a year-long period during the COVID-19 pandemic, while drummer Josh Dun engineered the drum tracks remotely. The band had initially planned on embarking on a "victory lap" tour of arenas and festivals to draw the album cycle for Trench to a close, but the pandemic had instead left them with more free time than they were accustomed to. Joseph recalled being faced with two potential directions for the album when its writing process began in 2020, either to "lean into what [he] felt like everyone was feeling, this ominous world is ending feel", or to "kind of escape from that feeling", eventually choosing the latter approach. Dun had revealed in November 2020 that they were still working "remotely" on the album, with both members being in different locations during the time. He describes the recording process, "we both have our own studios, which is really nice, so he comes up with a lot of stuff at his studio, sends it over to me, and then I come up with some stuff here at my studio and then send it back".

Scaled and Icy is the first studio album to involve Joseph's youngest brother, Jay Joseph, who performs vocally alongside five of Jay's close friends on "Never Take It", "Bounce Man" and "No Chances".

Title and artwork

The album's title is a play on "scaled back and isolated", a phrase frontman Tyler Joseph associated with the COVID-19 pandemic and its impact on the music produced at the time. On an interview with Sirius XM, he stated that he wanted to "lean into being aware that things are scaled back and that we're isolated". Despite that, Joseph's goal was to create an album that contrasts this very idea and that conveys the opposite of it. The album title is also an anagram of "Clancy is dead", a reference to the protagonist of their previous album, Trench; the band has however neither described this as coincidental nor declined to comment on this subject. The title's initials appear on the cover art for their 2020 single "Christmas Saves the Year", on which the sentence "SAI is propaganda" is written in purple on one of the wrapped gifts.

The cover artwork for Scaled and Icy was designed by Brandon Rike, who also designed the cover art for Trench and Blurryface. It features a scaled, teal dragon breathing yellow fire over a pink background, as well as a psi symbol in the top right corner. The dragon is named Trash, and represents "inspiration, fear, and magic"; Joseph explained that he wanted to "tie the songs to something as powerful as that". The creature was originally drawn by British illustrator Walter Crane in a children's book from the 1860s (the artwork is in the public domain, allowing the band to use it in the album cover). Its usage was also inspired by a small dragon figurine Joseph keeps in his home studio, with Joseph revealing to BBC Radio 1 that it represented an idea that if he were to focus on a single detail of a small room, "then that detail can then come to life".

Composition
Scaled and Icy has been described as, "at first listen, the most upbeat and optimistic the band have sounded since they first emerged in 2009", which Joseph explained is a reaction against the "strange and bleak conditions" caused by the COVID-19 pandemic, during which the album was recorded. Critics specifically noted its departure from the darker approach of Trench (2018) and Blurryface (2015) and a return to the "playful alt-pop sound" of Vessel (2013), with Joseph stating that the record is a "bit of a reaction to Trench". The album has also been described as alternative rock, pop, rock, rap and synth-pop, with elements of electro.

Although a departure from the conceptual narrative found on Trench, the band largely continues to examine serious themes on Scaled and Icy despite its upbeat sound. Joseph explained that the contrast was deliberate, stating that "as you dive into lyrics, a lot of times it's asking some pretty heavy questions and addressing some pretty heavy things". Neil Z. Yeung of AllMusic described the album as "a snapshot of the emotional highs and lows of quarantine life", while Augusta Battoclette of Alternative Press noted the themes of "anxiety, doubt and the need to keep your loved ones close".

Tours 

On June 16, 2021, Twenty One Pilots announced the Takeover Tour. The tour began in Denver, Colorado and the band spent one week in each city, where they performed at small clubs as well as large venues. The tour began on September 21, 2021. On July 23, 2021, the artists Half Alive, Arrested Youth and Jay Joseph were announced as openers for the U.S. leg of the tour.

On November 18, 2021, the band announced a second tour of North America in support of the album called The Icy Tour, which started on August 18, 2022 in Saint Paul, Minnesota.

Release and promotion
The duo began teasing the era in January 2021 by updating their social media headers with an orange-tinged photo of the duo in an empty venue, the band's Trench era logo placed between them. The following month, Joseph posted a selfie to his Instagram story featuring a blue psi symbol over his right eye. On April 2, 2021, a progress bar appeared on dmaorg.info—a website the band uses to share background stories and lore—which appeared to be deleting files. When the progress bar timed out three days later, three posters appeared on the page announcing a new album titled Scaled and Icy and a "Livestream Experience" scheduled for May 21, 2021. The lead single "Shy Away" premiered on BBC Radio 1 on April 7, with a music video being released shortly after alongside an official album announcement on the band's social media. A second single, "Choker", premiered on the band's livestream pre-access website, with fans participating in a release event. The music video and single were premiered on April 30, 2021, at 12:00am ET. The third single from the album, "Saturday", was released on May 18, 2021, with a music video for the song released on July 8, 2021. The song "The Outside" was released as a single for the album on November 24, 2021. On March 18, 2022, the duo released a music video for the song "The Outside".

Livestream event
The duo was initially reluctant to do a livestream concert, arguing that "you can't recreate a live experience on a stream". However, they changed their minds as they resolved to "create something that's never been done before", and promised in an interview with NME that "it's not going to be stale by song two, like every other livestream concert." Their manager, Chris Woltman, stressed that it would be different from their past live shows, describing it as "a convergence of live theater mixed with a livestream moment and a Twenty One Pilots show". Work on the event began in July 2020, and required 150 production and support staff, 12 cameras, almost 30,000 square feet of on-set floor space, over 130 rehearsal hours, and 13 days for its set-up, rehearsal and the show itself according to the band's management. The show's synopsis ties in closely to the storyline from Trench, featuring numerous Easter eggs concerning the band's lore. The livestream experience's page received 3.6 million session from April 7, which included 3.48 million hours of watch time from 202 international territories on one million different devices, 56% of them outside the USA. The event garnered high praise from various publications, including NME, who awarded it five stars, with Ali Shutler calling it "one of the most forward-thinking shows that've been attempted in over a year" which "sees them push the limit on just what a livestream can be". Gil Kaufman of Billboard meanwhile described it as "eye-popping" and a "Las Vegas-worthy spectacle".

On April 8, 2022, a year after the announcement of the livestream and album, the duo announced a reshowing of the livestream exclusively in select theaters, which had premiered on May 19, 2022 worldwide.

According to The Numbers, the movie earned more or less $1,560,000 worldwide.

Critical reception

Scaled and Icy received generally positive reviews from music critics overall. On Metacritic, which assigns a normalized rating out of 100 to reviews from mainstream critics, the album has an average score of 70, based on 9 critical reviews, indicating "generally favorable reviews".

Ali Shutler of NME praised the album as "an expectation-crushing statement of ambition", noting its more optimistic and upbeat tone compared to the band's earlier work while still remaining "very much in the Twenty One Pilots universe". The Guardians Rachel Aroesti also noted the "move away from this anxious melancholy"; she claimed that while fans would "view this shift as hard-won hopefulness", listeners unfamiliar with the band would find the album "pleasingly buoyant, if conspicuously USP-less". Jake Richardson of Kerrang! considered that although "there are times on Scaled And Icy where things just feel a little safe", it "is a good record which balances out the occasional underwhelming moment with flashes of brilliance that could only come from its creators".

Steven Loftin of The Line of Best Fit commended the album's fun sound and the progression it represented for the band, concluding that "while it's not a home run, as a society it's a time for exploration and change, and the duo have pasted the pastel colours on heavy ready for when the sunshine decides to grace us with its presence". Writing for Stereogum, Chris DeVille opined that the album "maintains the knack for poppy off-kilter rock music that made the band stars in the first place" aside from "a few clunkers", and considered that it represented an evolution towards a more grown-up sound and image. Clashs meanwhile asserted that "most – though not all of these tracks having you reaching for the replay button", and added that "memorable is definitely the word to describe the album". However, Mason Meyers of Gigwise called the album "an unfocused, often forgettable, attempt to appeal to the masses with cutesy pop tunes".

Several reviews criticised the loose relationship between the album's content and the surrounding concept. Ludovic Hunter-Tilney was critical of the record's "contradictory tones" in his assessment for the Financial Times, arguing that "tracks are caught between servicing the concept and existing in their own right", and concluded that "the result suggests indecision, not an enigmatic layer of mystery". David Smyth of the Evening Standard also highlighted the contrast between the "bright and poppy" sound of the album and its conceptual promotion, asking: "Is it worth sticking around to hunt for secret messages though? Not really." Conversely, AllMusic's Neil Z. Yeung wrote that "whether or not they decide to revive their ongoing album mythology, Scaled and Icy will remain a quick dose of TOP perfection, a lean catalog gem that is bright, effervescent, and immensely addictive."

Accolades 
The album won Top Rock Album at the 2022 Billboard Music Awards, beating out OK Orchestra by AJR, Music of the Spheres by Coldplay, Mercury – Act 1 by Imagine Dragons, and Sob Rock by John Mayer.

Track listing

Notes
  indicates an additional producer

Personnel 
Credits adapted from the liner notes of Scaled and Icy.

Twenty One Pilots
 Tyler Joseph – lead vocals, guitar, bass, piano, keyboards, organs, programming, ukulele, songwriting, executive production
 Josh Dun – drums (all tracks), percussion, trumpet, drum engineering (2, 3, 6, 8)

Additional musicians
 Mike Elizondo – bass, piano (1, 7)
 Paul Meany – production (5, 11)
 Greg Kurstin – production (5)
 Brittany Haas – violin (1)
 Steven Patrick – trumpet (1, 7)
 Matt Pauling – violin (2)
 Jay Joseph – group vocals (6, 9, 10)
 Payton Byrd – group vocals (6, 9, 10)
 J. R. Bowers – group vocals (6, 9, 10)
 Christopher Matis – group vocals (6, 9, 10)
 Kyle Schmidt – group vocals (6, 9, 10)
 Jack Peterman – group vocals (6, 9, 10)

Technical
 Adam Hawkins – mixing
 Chris Gehringer – mastering
 Lawson White – engineering (1, 7)
 Matt Pauling – drum engineering (2, 6)
 T. J. Bechill – group vocal engineering (6, 9, 10)
 Erica Block – engineering assistance (1, 7)
 Zachary Stokes – engineering assistance (1, 7)
 Chris Woltman – executive production

Design
 Mark Eshleman – creative direction (video)
 Brandon Rike – creative direction (design)
 Ashley Osborn – photography

Charts

Weekly charts

Year-end charts

Certifications

References

External links

Twenty One Pilots albums
Fueled by Ramen albums
2021 albums
Concept albums
Albums recorded in a home studio
Albums impacted by the COVID-19 pandemic